Marshall Landing is an unincorporated community in Calhoun County, Illinois, United States. Marshall Landing is located along the Illinois River near its confluence with the Mississippi River in far southeastern Calhoun County.

References

Unincorporated communities in Calhoun County, Illinois
Unincorporated communities in Illinois